Coila or Koila was a town in ancient Arcadia. It is mentioned in an inscription at Delphi, dated near the end of the fifth century or the beginning of the fourth century BCE, regarding the appointment of a theorodokos of Coila.

Its exact location is unknown.

References

Populated places in ancient Arcadia
Former populated places in Greece
Lost ancient cities and towns